The men's 1500 meter at the 2020 KNSB Dutch Single Distance Championships took place in Heerenveen at the Thialf ice skating rink on Saturday 28 December 2019. There were 20 participants.

Statistics

Result

Source:

Draw

References

Single Distance Championships
2020 Single Distance